Balmazújvárosi Városi Sportpálya is a sports stadium in Balmazújváros, Hungary. The stadium is home to association football side Balmazújvárosi FC. The stadium has a capacity of 2,435.

History
On 5 April 2013 Balmazújváros hosted Ferencvárosi TC II in the 2012–13 Nemzeti Bajnokság II season at Oláh Gábor utcai Stadion, Debrecen, due to the reconstruction of their stadium.

References

External links 
Magyarfutball.hu 

Football venues in Hungary
Balmazújvárosi FC